Staphylococcus simulans is a Gram-positive, coagulase-negative member of the bacterial genus Staphylococcus consisting of single, paired, and clustered cocci.

References

External links
Type strain of Staphylococcus simulans at BacDive -  the Bacterial Diversity Metadatabase

simulans
Bacteria described in 1975